is a Japanese idol singer, model, and actress. She is a member of Nogizaka46 and an exclusive model for the magazines MAQUIA and bis. She has played supporting roles in the television dramas Mob Psycho 100 and Zambi.

Biography 
Yoda was born on May 5, 2000 in Shika Island, Fukuoka Prefecture. Her entertainment career began in 2016 when she successfully auditioned for the third generation of the idol group Nogizaka46.
Yoda and her fellow third generation members performed their first full live concert in May 2017.
Her first selection for Nogizaka46's main performance group came in August 2017, when she was selected for Nogizaka46's 18th single "Nigemizu".
She has also been selected to appear in advertising campaigns for Mouse Computer and 7-Eleven.

In December 2017, Yoda released her first photobook titled , which became the bestselling photobook in Japan that week, and the tenth bestselling photobook in 2018 with 66,314 sold. She later became an exclusive model for the fashion magazines MAQUIA and bis.

Yoda's first acting role came in 2018 with the TV Tokyo adaptation of the webcomic Mob Psycho 100. A stage role in the horror play Zambi followed, with Yoda joining the cast alongside several members of Nogizaka46 and Keyakizaka46. Yoda reprised her role for the 2019 Nippon TV adaptation of Zambi. She played the lead role of Chisa Kotegawa in the 2020 live-action adaptation of the manga Grand Blue.

In March 2020, Yoda released her second photobook titled Mukuchi na Jikan (無口な時間).

Discography

Singles with Nogizaka46

Albums with Nogizaka46

Other featured songs

Filmography

Film

Television

Theater

Bibliography

Photobooks 
 (December 26, 2017, Gentosha), 
  (March 10, 2020, Kobunsha),

References

External links 

 
 

Living people
2000 births
21st-century Japanese actresses
Nogizaka46 members
Japanese idols
Japanese women pop singers
Japanese female models
Musicians from Fukuoka Prefecture
21st-century Japanese singers
21st-century Japanese women singers